Empire Tower may refer to:

 Empire Tower, Bangkok in Bangkok, Thailand
 Empire Tower, Colombo in Colombo, Sri Lanka
 Empire Tower, Malaysia in Kuala Lumpur, Malaysia
 Empire Tower, Toronto in Toronto, Canada
 , a cargo ship torpedoed and sunk during the Second World War